Squash at the 2019 Pacific Games in Apia, Samoa was held on 8–19 July 2019. The competition schedule included men's, women's and mixed events. The tournament was played on the Samoa Squash Courts at the Faleata Sports Complex in Tuanaimato, and the Oceania Squash Championships were held in conjunction with the Pacific Games at the same venue.

Teams
The nations competing were:

Medal summary

Medal table

Medalists

See also
 Squash at the Pacific Games

References

2019 Pacific Games
Pacific Games
2019